Route 194, known as Sullivan Avenue for its entire length, is a Connecticut state highway located entirely within the town of South Windsor. It connects the historic village of East Windsor Hill to the town center.

Route description

Route 194 starts at an intersection with US 5 in the village of East Windsor Hill and proceeds eastward. Half a mile later, it crosses over some railroad tracks and continues east towards the Podunk River. The road turns south after crossing the river and eventually meets with Route 74 in South Windsor center. It ends after another  at an intersection with Route 30 in the town center. Route 194 has short four lane sections near its termini but is otherwise a two lane minor arterial road. It carries traffic volumes of about 14,000 per day.

History
Route 194 was established as a new route in the 1932 state highway renumbering and has had no major changes since then.  The western terminus was moved slightly east in the early 1940s when US 5 was rerouted. In 1996, the state proposed widening Route 194, but this proposal was never carried out. In 1998, the intersection at Ayers and Graham Roads was improved for safety reasons.

Junction list

References

External links

194
Transportation in Hartford County, Connecticut